WFC Alina Kyiv was a Soviet and Ukrainian women's football club from Kyiv.

History
Founded in 1990 as Radosin Kyiv, it entered the Soviet competitions in 1990 in the Second League for the next two seasons.

Following dissolution of the Soviet Union, in 1992 the club entered Ukrainian competitions plying in the First League. The club was promoted to the Top League due to expansion and liquidation of the First League. Radosin Kyiv became Alina Kyiv, which entered Top League.

In 1997 the club became a national champion and was dissolved.

Titles
 Ukrainian League
 Winners (1): 1997
 Runners-up (1): 1995
 Ukrainian Cup
 Winners (1): 1995, 1997
 Runners-up (1): 1994, 1996

References

 
Football clubs in Kyiv
Ukrainian Women's League clubs
Defunct women's football clubs in Ukraine
1990 establishments in Ukraine
1997 disestablishments in Ukraine
Association football clubs established in 1990
Association football clubs disestablished in 1997